Hernán Ferraro  (born ) is an Argentine male former volleyball player. He was part of the Argentina men's national volleyball team. He competed with the national team at the 2004 Summer Olympics in Athens, Greece. He played with Rojas Scholem in 2004. After retiring, he took several coaching jobs, before becoming the principal coach of the Argentina women's national volleyball team in 2018.

Clubs
  Rojas Scholem (2004)

See also
 Argentina at the 2004 Summer Olympics

References

1968 births
Argentine men's volleyball players
Living people
Olympic volleyball players of Argentina
Place of birth missing (living people)
Volleyball players at the 2004 Summer Olympics